The BMW 2 Series (G42) is the second generation of the BMW 2 Series subcompact executive coupé, the successor in 2021 to the F22 2 Series coupé and convertible. The G42 2 is the first BMW vehicle designed by BMW of Mexico, and is produced in BMW's plant in San Luis Potosí, Mexico since 2 September 2021.

Development and launch 

Remaining a rear-wheel-drive-based model, the G42 is built on the CLAR platform with a roughly 50:50 weight distribution and shares many mechanical components and engine options with the G20 3 Series and G22 4 Series. Unlike its predecessor, the base second-generation 2 Series and M240i coupé is no longer available with a manual transmission and not complemented with a convertible body style. The launch models consist of the mild hybrid diesel engine 220d, the petrol engine 220i and 230i and the M240i xDrive.

Equipment 

Standard equipment in the US market includes Apple CarPlay, Android Auto, 10 speaker stereo's, adaptive cruise control, tyre pressure monitor and Active Driving Assistant. What Car? found that the rotary controller for the satellite navigation was less distracting to use than the touchscreen. Top Gear magazine felt that the coupé's physical buttons were more user friendly than the touchscreen interfaces in other BMW models.

M Performance Parts 
218-230 with the M Sport trim and M240 models can be fitted with M Performance Parts. These include a carbon fibre front splitter, side skirts and spoiler, M rims, a sport steering wheel and a door projector.

Models

Petrol engines

Diesel engines

BMW M2

M2 (G87) 

In October 2022, BMW revealed the second generation of the high-performance M2, with sales beginning in 2023. Like its predecessor, it is rear-wheel-drive only and has both manual and automatic transmissions. It uses the twin-turbo S58 engine, which has been detuned compared to the M3 and M4 models.

References

External links 

 

2 Series
Cars introduced in 2021
2020s cars
Compact cars
Coupés
Rear-wheel-drive vehicles
All-wheel-drive vehicles